Mesodactylites, which is sometimes considered to be a synonym of Nodicoeloceras is genus of ammonite that lived during early to middle Toarcian stage (Serpentinum to Bifrons ammonite Zones) of early Jurassic. Their fossils were found in southern and central Europe and northern Africa. It has  evolved from Nodicoeloceras.

Description
Ammonites belonging to this genus have small to medium-sized shells. Coiling is cadicone to moderately evolute. Subcircular whorl section has convex flanks and rounded venter. Ribs can be simple or bifurcating. On ventrolateral position, there are tubercules, mostly on phragmocone.

References

Ammonitida
Toarcian life
Early Jurassic ammonites of Europe
Ammonites of Africa
Ammonite genera